The Cairo Codex is a manuscript discovered in 1907 that contained the first significant fragments of plays by the ancient Greek playwright Menander, including parts of Epitrepontes (Men at Arbitration), Perikeiromene (She Who Was Sheared) and Samia (The Girl from Samos).

References

Ancient Greek works
Greek manuscripts